Brad Moran may refer to:

Brad Moran (ice hockey) (born 1979), Canadian ice hockey player
Brad Moran (footballer) (born 1986), Australian rules footballer with Adelaide